Karatay Congress and Sport Center is a multi-sport indoor arena located in Karatay, Konya, Turkey.

The Congress and Sport Center is located in Fetih neighborhood of Karatay district in Konya. It was built by the district municipality, and was opened on 17 December 2013. Owned by the municipality, it is used mainly for volleyball events. The venue has a seating capacity of 10,000. 

It hosted the volleyball and the Karate competitions of the 2021 Islamic Solidarity Games. At the court before the center, the 3x3 basketball events of the Games were held.

References

Convention centers in Turkey
Sports venues in Konya
Indoor arenas in Turkey
Volleyball venues in Turkey
Sports venues completed in 2013
2013 establishments in Turkey
Karatay District